The Sutton Heritage Mosaic is a large mural in the form of a mosaic situated in Sutton High Street in the town of Sutton in Greater London, England. One of the largest examples of wall art in Britain, it was commissioned by the London Borough of Sutton to celebrate the borough's heritage.

Location
The mural is on the side of a three-storey building on the corner of High Street and St Nicholas Road at Trinity Square (the main town square).

Description

The centrepiece is Henry VIII's Nonsuch Palace in Nonsuch Park. Surrounding this are shown the heraldic beasts of the coats of arms of the historic local families of Carew, Gaynesford and Lumley. The mural also features local heritage buildings such as Honeywood House and All Saints Church in Carshalton Village; and the Old Cottage and Whitehall in Cheam Village. Old industries are also covered, represented by the inclusion of a River Wandle mill. The early railway line, which was routed alongside the river is illustrated, as is a Hannibal biplane, which used the former Croydon Airport.

Design and construction
The mural was designed by public artist Rob Turner, and created by him with fellow artist Gary Drostle. The artists had presented the borough's Public Arts Committee with six designs, and the Committee chose one, depicting local history in nineteen panels. Appledown Properties Ltd provided the financing.

The mosaic was created from vitreous ceramic tesserae and put in place in 1994. It was initially created in a studio, using the reverse technique, whereby a full-size outline was drawn on paper in reverse. The tiles were then affixed to the paper with flour-and-water glue. At the end of the process, the paper and glue were washed off with water and the mosaic was grouted and polished. Consisting of well over 100,000 pieces, the mosaic took over 1,500 hours to design and construct.

2011 information plaque
A plaque describing the panels was installed in 2011, and unveiled by Councillor Graham Tope, Executive Member for Community Safety, Leisure and Libraries, who said:

See also
 Sutton twin towns mural
 Sutton armillary
 The Messenger (sculpture in Sutton)

References

1994 works
Tourist attractions in the London Borough of Sutton
Murals in London
Sutton, London
Mosaics